is a Japanese snowboarder. She competed in the 2018 Winter Olympics.

References

1993 births
Living people
Sportspeople from Sapporo
Snowboarders at the 2018 Winter Olympics
Japanese female snowboarders
Olympic snowboarders of Japan
Snowboarders at the 2017 Asian Winter Games
X Games athletes
21st-century Japanese women